Gerrit Bouwhuis (27 May 1888 – 23 March 1957) was a Dutch sports shooter. He competed in the team free rifle event at the 1924 Summer Olympics.

References

External links
 

1888 births
1957 deaths
Dutch male sport shooters
Olympic shooters of the Netherlands
Shooters at the 1924 Summer Olympics
People from Ommen
Sportspeople from Overijssel
20th-century Dutch people